In Between Now and Then is the fourth studio album released by the rock band O.A.R. in 2003.  (See 2003 in music.)  The album debuted on the Billboard 200 at number 54. The song, "Hey Girl", was previously featured on the albums Soul's Aflame and Risen.

Track listing
 "Now" – 0:19
 "Dareh Meyod" – 3:41
 "Risen" – 4:13
 "Right on Time" – 5:16
 "Mr. Moon" – 4:03
 "Revisited" – 6:29
 "Hey Girl" – 4:13
 "James" – 5:16
 "Coalminer" – 4:15
 "Old Man Time" – 4:38
 "Anyway" – 4:15
 "Road Outside Columbus" – 4:16
 "Any Time Now" – 3:56
 "Whose Chariot?" – 7:51
 "Then" – 0:08

Personnel
O.A.R.
Chris Culos - drums
Benj Gershman - bass
Richard On - electric guitar, background vocals
Jerry DePizzo - saxophone
Marc Roberge - vocals, electric & acoustic guitars

Additional Musicians
John Alagia - backup vocals, acoustic guitar, electric guitar, Hammond, Wurlitzer, tambourine, bongos, maracas, ebo
Gabe Dixon - backup vocals, Hammond, piano, tack piano
Johnathan Rice - backup vocals

Chart positions

2003 albums
O.A.R. albums
Albums produced by John Alagía